Cristian Sîrghi (born 23 November 1986) is a Romanian professional footballer who plays as a centre back for Liga II side Oțelul Galați.

Honours
Oțelul Galați
Liga I: 2010–11
Supercupa României: 2011
Liga III: 2020–21, 2021–22

References

External links
 

1987 births
Living people
Sportspeople from Galați
Romanian footballers
Association football defenders
Association football fullbacks
ASC Oțelul Galați players
Maccabi Netanya F.C. players
CS Concordia Chiajna players
Ermis Aradippou FC players
CS Pandurii Târgu Jiu players
CS Gaz Metan Mediaș players
Flamurtari Vlorë players
FC Dunărea Călărași players
FC Petrolul Ploiești players
Liga I players
Liga II players
Israeli Premier League players
Cypriot First Division players
Kategoria Superiore players
Romanian expatriate footballers
Romanian expatriate sportspeople in Israel
Expatriate footballers in Israel
Romanian expatriate sportspeople in Cyprus
Expatriate footballers in Cyprus
Romanian expatriate sportspeople in Albania
Expatriate footballers in Albania